WDVB-CD (channel 23) is a low-power, Class A TBN Inspire owned-and-operated television station licensed to Edison, New Jersey, United States, and serving the New York City television market. Owned by the Tustin, California–based Trinity Broadcasting Network, it is sister to Jersey City, New Jersey–licensed TBN owned-and-operated station WTBY-TV (channel 54). The two stations share studios on East 15th Street in the Union Square neighborhood in Manhattan and transmitter facilities at the Empire State Building.

Development

This station signed on over UHF channel 36 with the alphanumeric call sign W36AS in March 1991. The station aired Asian independent programming. In 2004, it became an affiliate of ImaginAsian and dropped the independent format. On January 4, 2005, the station vacated channel 36 to avoid causing interference to full-power WNJU Linden, which was assigned channel 36 for its DTV operations. The station moved to channel 39, and was assigned alphanumeric call sign W39CQ. The station requested and was granted Class A status. On February 16, 2005, the call sign was changed to WDVB-CA. In early 2010, ImaginAsian was dropped. With no programming immediately available to replace it, WDVB-CA was only airing a color bars test pattern.

In March 2013, WDVB's class A status was transferred from an analog station to a digital station (which became WDVB-CD), and the analog license was turned in; the analog signal had left the air for technical reasons on February 9. Shortly afterward, Edison Broadcasting filed to sell the station to LocusPoint Networks. The sale closed on August 19, 2013. In 2017, TBN O&O WTBY-TV began channel sharing with WDVB-CD. In 2018, LocusPoint Networks sold WDVB-CD to TBN, creating a duopoly with WTBY-TV.

Subchannels
The station's digital signal is multiplexed:

References

External links
 fccinfo.com Information on former WDVB-CA

DVB-CD
DVB-CD
Television channels and stations established in 1999
1999 establishments in New Jersey
Low-power television stations in the United States